The 1932–33 Kansas Jayhawks men's basketball team represented the University of Kansas during the 1932–33 college men's basketball season.

Roster
Theodore O'Leary
Leland Page
William Johnson
Ernest Vanek
Elmer Schaake
Paul Harrington
Carl Benn
Lawrence Filkin
Roy Klaas
Raymond Urie
Gordon Gray
Dick Wells

Schedule

References

Kansas Jayhawks men's basketball seasons
Kansas
Kansas
Kansas